The Signora Giveret Synagogue is an Orthodox Jewish synagogue in the city of Izmir, Turkey. The synagogue dates back to the 16th century and is still in use today.

History
Signora Giveret Synagogue was built by a Portuguese merchant in 16th century. It stands at the junction of 927 Street (known as Havra Sokak (‘Synagogue Street’)) with Anafartalar Avenue. The building was damaged in the major fire of 1841, and subsequently restored by the Yeruşalmi family according to the original design. The new construction also used Italian architecture style.

Context
Signora Giveret Synagogue has a big yard surrounded by massive, high walls that block the view from the outside. There are add-on structures in the yard that are referred to as Bet Midaş. Şalom and Algaze Synagogues, on Havra street, are neighboring buildings. The synagogue is located in Kemeraltı, a historic bazaar of İzmir, forming a network of small shops, stores and narrow streets which surround the synagogue.

Architecture and features

Congregants access a terrace via a 5 step stairway. The portable spruce wall of the synagogue merges with the torah ark. Seats are arranged linearly, similar to church interiors. The mechitza starts in the entrance hall open to the main interior. This space adjoins the hekal wall as a mezzanine which is separated by wooden latices. The structure is a double standard construction space and is seen as a single volume. It was constructed using stone masonry. The building has a wooden hip roof. The floor and ceiling are also wooden. The building entrance is a simple iron door. From the entrance one can see across the north facade of the building, which also has a simple view. Through a short hallway one can reach the yard and the entrance of the building. The building has modest furniture and many windows for natural light. Seats are arranged carefully and owners' names are carved on some of them. Some wooden seats are located on the sides, next to the walls.

Structural features 

The building is made of stone and brick and has a rectangular floor plan. It is covered by a wooden hipped roof. One can reach the mechitza, which is on top of entering hall, through the yard. This space was placed against the hekal wall as a mezzanine which separated by wooden latices. In floor and ceiling contain tiles and wood. The inside contains bronze flowers surrounded by green geometric forms on the ceiling, spruce torah cabinet and bordeaux coverings. Since the building is masonry work, the window openings are arched. The windows in north and south facade give the building natural light.

External links

References 

16th-century synagogues
Buildings and structures in İzmir
Jews and Judaism in İzmir
Kemeraltı
Portuguese-Jewish diaspora
Sephardi Jewish culture in Turkey
Sephardi synagogues
Spanish and Portuguese Jews
Synagogues in Turkey